The Rejection is the debut EP by American electropop duo Dangerous Muse, released on November 8, 2005.

Track listing
 "The Rejection" - 3:54
 "All Yours (The Doctor)" - 3:16
 "Apart" - 4:10

External links
 The official Dangerous Muse site

2005 EPs
Dangerous Muse albums